Operation Campbell Streamer was a joint U.S. Army and Army of the Republic of Vietnam (ARVN) military operation during the Vietnam War to engage People's Army of Vietnam (PAVN) units in the Bạch Mã.

Background
The PAVN 4th Regiment's base areas in the Bạch Mã posed an ongoing threat to Highway 1.

Operation
The operation began with the combat assault of the 2nd Battalion, 502nd Infantry Regiment into Firebase Sledge followed by the ARVN 1st and 3rd Battalions of the 54th Regiment into their respective landing zones. In the first phase a reconnaissance was mounted by the three assaulting elements to locate and destroy the PAVN forces on the north side of the Bạch Mã. Contact was very light during this phase. The second phase commenced on 27 June with the deployment of the 1st Battalion, 327th Infantry Regiment to a screening position south of the Bạch Mã in Elephant Valley and the three maneuver battalions reoriented to the south. On 28 July elements of the ARVN 1/54th made the first significant contact by killing 27 PAVN and capturing 22 individual and 9 crew-served weapons.

Aftermath
Results as of 31 July 1969 were 51 PAVN/VC killed, 1 captured and 27 individual and 11 crew-served weapons captured.

References

1969 in Vietnam
Battles involving Vietnam
Battles and operations of the Vietnam War
Battles involving the United States
Battles and operations of the Vietnam War in 1969
History of Thừa Thiên Huế province